North Richmond is an official unbounded neighbourhood located in inner Melbourne in the vicinity of North Richmond railway station.  It is in the local government area of the City of Yarra.

Victoria Street, Richmond Post Office opened on 3 November 1906 and was renamed Richmond North in 1924. An earlier Richmond North office was open from 1873 until 1880.

References

Localities of Melbourne
City of Yarra